Raviv is a Hebrew name.  Notable people with the name include:

 Raviv Drucker, Israeli journalist, political commentator and investigative reporter 
Raviv Limonad (born 1984), Israeli basketball player 
Raviv Pitshon (born 1989), Israeli basketball player 
 Raviv Ullman, Israeli-American actor
Raviv Zoller, Israeli business executive
Raviv Weidenfeld (born 1970), Israeli tennis player
 Avishai Raviv, Israeli member of SBK
 Dan Raviv, American journalist
 Ilana Raviv, Israeli artist

Given names